Kevin Pearce may refer to:

 Kevin Pearce (cricketer) (born 1960), Australian cricketer 
 Kevin Pearce (writer) (born 1964), English music journalist and author 
 Kevin Pearce (snowboarder) (born 1987), American snowboarder from Norwich, Vermont
 Kevin Pearce (rugby league) (born 1935/36), New Zealand rugby league player